Alec Urosevski (Alec Uroševski, born 15 February 1994) is an Australian footballer who plays as a striker for Rockdale Ilinden.

Club career

Sydney FC
In 2012, Urosevski made his debut for Rockdale City Suns FC team in NPL NSW. In the following year he joined with Sydney FC He made his A-League debut for Sydney FC against Central Coast Mariners coming on as a substitute. He played for Sydney FC for the next two season in the A-league.

Urosevski competed with Sydney FC Youth in 2013 Thanh Niên Cup, finishing in second place. Urosevski scored five goals in the tournament, winning the Golden Boot.

In April 2014, Urosevski went on to play with Sydney United, on loan from Sydney FC.

Rockdale Ilinden
Urosevski returned to join Rockdale City Suns FC team in NPL NSW side on 7 December 2014. In 2018, Urosevksi helped his side beat Blacktown City in the NPL NSW semi final, scoring a penalty to end the game 2-0. In 2020, Urosevski played a crucial role in Rockdale's premiership win, helping the club end their 51 year title drought and ending the season with 4 goals. During the 2022 season, he was the club top goalscorer, scoring 10 goals in 10 games making his side 9 games undefeated at the time. He scored 4 goals against Sydney FC Youth to send Ilinden to top 5 in the league table. At the end of the season, he came 2nd in the Golden Boot, coming 1 goal shorter than Sydney Olympic player Roy O'Donovan who scored 21 goals. He was also shortlisted for Player of the Year which was won by Jaiden Kucharski.

Personal life
Urosevski works as a baker in Alexander’s Bakery which earned him the nickname "The Baker" from his teammates. He is happily married to Tatiana and has a son named Tommy.

Honours 
Rockdale Ilinden FC 
NPL NSW Men's Premiers: 2020

Sydney FC
Thanh Niên Cup Golden Boot: 2013

References 

1994 births
Australian soccer players
Australian people of Macedonian descent
Sydney FC players
Rockdale Ilinden FC players
Sydney United 58 FC players
Soccer players from Sydney
Association football forwards
Living people
National Premier Leagues players